Phrynotettix robustus, known generally as the robust toad lubber or robust toad hopper, is a species of lubber grasshopper in the family Romaleidae. It is found in North America.

Subspecies
These three subspecies belong to the species Phrynotettix robustus:
 Phrynotettix robustus manicola Rehn and Grant, 1959
 Phrynotettix robustus occultus Rehn and Grant, 1959
 Phrynotettix robustus robustus (Bruner, 1889)

References

Further reading

 
 
 
 

Romaleidae